The East Ham North by-election of 29 April 1926 was held after the death of the Conservative politician and Member of Parliament (MP) Charles Williamson Crook. Labour took the seat in the by-election. with a majority of 1,627

Candidates
George Jarrett was the Conservative candidate and a director of a printing and publishing company.
Susan Lawrence was the Labour candidate and had previous held the seat.
Leslie Burgin was the Liberal Party candidate and a solicitor specialising in international law.

Result

See also 
 List of United Kingdom by-elections (1918–1931)

References

East Ham North by-election
East Ham North by-election
East Ham North,1926
East Ham North,1926
East Ham North,1926
1920s in Essex
East Ham